Pilot Travel Centers LLC, doing business as Pilot Flying J, is a North American chain of truck stops in the United States and Canada. The company is based in Knoxville, Tennessee, where Pilot Corporation, the minority owner, is based. The company is owned by Berkshire Hathaway and Pilot. The company operates truck stops under the Pilot Travel Centers, Flying J Travel Plaza, and Mr. Fuel brands.

History
Pilot Corporation opened its first truck stop in 1981. On November 15, 1993, Pilot entered a joint venture with Marathon Petroleum Company, and all Pilot Truck Stops were renamed Pilot Travel Centers. At its inception, the number of stops was around 60; however, that was to be short-lived.

In the next few years, Pilot Travel Centers experienced significant growth. Marathon converted many Speedway truck stops, wholly owned by Marathon, over to the Pilot Travel Center moniker starting in mid-2002. Midway through 2003, another major expansion occurred with the purchase of the Williams Truck Stop chain. The Marathon-Pilot joint venture successfully increased the Pilot Travel Center name recognition throughout the United States, as the number of stops more than quadrupled.

In 2008, Pilot bought out Marathon's interest in the business and entered into a new partnership arrangement with CVC Capital Partners, an international private equity firm. Pilot also has partnerships with Road Ranger and Town Pump, and purchased a controlling stake in Mr. Fuel in 2014. In October 2014, Pilot Flying J announced they would borrow funds to provide a $750 million dividend to shareholders and facilitate a buyout of its private-equity partner CVC Capital Partner. In 2015, the Haslam family completed the buyout of CVC Capital Partner's stake.

Flying J merger

In July 2009, Pilot agreed to purchase Flying J's travel centers, as a part of Flying J's efforts to remove itself from Chapter 11 bankruptcy. The deal was finalized July 1, 2010, and the combined company took the d.b.a. name Pilot Flying J, while Pilot Travel Centers LLC remained the company's legal name.

As part of the deal, both the Pilot and Flying J chains will keep their identities intact, while both chains started accepting the Comdata and Flying J's in-house TCH fuel cards. In addition, Flying J received cash and equity in the new combined chain. Flying J's oil & refining operations as well as its banking & insurance division will remain separate from the new company, and was subsequently renamed FJ Management Inc.

To settle antitrust concerns with the Federal Trade Commission, Pilot sold 20 Pilot Travel Centers locations and six Flying J locations to Love's Travel Stops & Country Stores on June 30, 2010. The merger left the combined company with over 550 locations in 44 U.S. states and six Canadian provinces. In 2011, Pilot Flying J began a partnership with Truckers Against Trafficking.

PFJ Southeast
On June 23, 2016, Pilot Flying J and Speedway announced a new joint venture between the two companies that will see 41 Speedway locations (all former Wilco Hess locations) and 79 Pilot Flying J locations primarily in the Southeastern United States form PFJ Southeast LLC. The locations will be operated by Pilot Flying J and the Speedway locations will be rebranded as either Pilot or Flying J.

Berkshire Hathaway purchase
On October 3, 2017, it was announced that Warren Buffett-controlled Berkshire Hathaway will acquire 38.6% of Pilot Flying J, with plans to increase its stake to 80% in 2023. The Haslam family and FJ Management will retain ownership stakes until then, upon which the Haslam family will retain the remaining 20% and FJ Management will withdraw altogether. The Haslam family will retain control of day-to-day operations of the company.

Business profile

Currently, Pilot Flying J is the largest purveyor of over-the-road diesel fuel in the United States. Pilot Flying J also is known as the largest Travel Center chain in the country with over 750 locations under the Pilot, Flying J, & Mr. Fuel brands. Pilot Flying J is also the third largest franchiser of quick service restaurants in the nation, offering one to three different concepts at each location, making it the largest franchisee of Subway in the world with over 200 locations. Unlike many travel centers and truck stops, the majority of locations with the Pilot Travel Centers brand do not utilize full-service dining. However, the Flying J brand does utilize full-service dining with Denny's, as do a small handful of Pilot-branded locations.

Pilot Flying J's main restaurants include Arby's, Chester's Chicken, Dairy Queen, Denny's, Hardee's, McDonald's, Pizza Hut, Subway, Taco Bell, Wendy's, and Cinnabon. Recently they have also added Huddle House (full-service restaurants), Moe's Southwest Grill, and Dunkin Donuts.

Pilot Flying J's main competitors include Love's Travel Stops, Travel Centers of America, Stuckey's, Roady's Truck Stops, and T/A-owned Petro Stopping Centers.

In 2012, the company signed country music singer Trace Adkins to become its new spokesperson for its relaunched loyalty program. In addition to Adkins, the company has a NASCAR sponsorship with JR Motorsports driver Michael Annett as the primary sponsor for Annett's number 1 Chevrolet Camaro in NASCAR's Xfinity Series. In 2015 and 2016, the company sponsored Annett in the number 46 Chevrolet SS for HScott Motorsports in NASCAR's Sprint Cup Series and in 2014 the company sponsored Annett in the number 7 Chevrolet SS for Tommy Baldwin Racing. In 2013, the company sponsored Annett in the Richard Petty Motorsports number 43 Ford Mustang in NASCAR's Nationwide Series. In 2016, the company was the title sponsor for the "Battle at Bristol" at Bristol Motor Speedway.

Travel center amenities

Amenities featured at Pilot Flying J locations include:
Parking
CAT Scales
TRANSFLO Express travel documents
Trip Paks
Truck washes
Audiobook rental
Payphones
High speed internet kiosks
ATMs
Western Union
Check cashing
Public laundry
Showers
Game rooms
Wireless internet access
Lounges with big-screen televisions for professional drivers.

Truck repairs

At some locations, Pilot Flying J offers truck maintenance through garages operated by third-party companies. Wingfoot Truck Care Centers, operated by the Goodyear Tire & Rubber Company, provide 24-hour road service, preventative maintenance, tire service, part replacement, oil changes, and light mechanical work.

In addition to Wingfoot, Pilot Flying J also has Bosselman Boss Shop garages operated by Bosselman that provide similar services as Wingfoot. The Boss Shop partnership expanded as part of an agreement for Pilot Flying J to acquire most of Bosselman's truck stops in November 2011 in order to boost Pilot Flying J's presence in the Northern Great Plains region. Before the deal, Bosselman bought diesel fuel from Pilot and continues to do so for its remaining travel center location in Grand Island, Nebraska.

Magazine
In 2005, Pilot Flying J joined forces with Victory 500 marketing to publish Challenge magazine, a magazine aimed at professional truckers and sold exclusively at Pilot Flying J travel centers as well as by subscription. The magazine ceased publication after 110 issues in December 2014.

Rebate fraud

On April 15, 2013, the headquarters of Pilot Flying J, located in Knoxville, Tennessee, was raided by FBI and IRS agents as part of an "ongoing investigation". On April 16, CEO Jimmy Haslam reported the investigation involved claims of failure to pay rebates to trucking customers.

On April 18, 2013, an affidavit used to secure various search warrants was made public. The documents alleged that several members of the Pilot Flying J sales force, as well as company president Mark Hazelwood, were either involved or aware of the alleged scheme. Three sales employees' private homes were also raided as part of the investigation.

On Tuesday, July 16, 2013, a federal judge in Arkansas granted preliminary approval to a proposed settlement agreement between Pilot Flying J and several trucking companies that had sued over allegations of fuel rebate fraud. Pilot Flying J paid restitution to customers and agreed to pay a $92 million penalty pursuant to a Criminal Enforcement Agreement.

Flying J Heist 
At the Flying J truck stop along Interstate 5 in the Grapevine in Lebec, California, in the early hours of July 11, 2022 one of the armed guards left their Brink’s big rig while the other guard was asleep, giving a gang of thieves a 27-minute window to make a huge snatch of jewels that were being transported from San Mateo to the Los Angeles area for the International Gem and Jewelry Show.  Estimated value of the stolen goods range from $10 million to $100 million, making the jewelry theft one of the biggest in modern history.

See also
Love's Travel Stops & Country Stores

References

External links
Pilot Flying J
Marathon Petroleum Company, LLC
A timeline of the Pilot Flying J rebate fraud investigation

Marathon Oil
Oil companies of the United States
Truck stop chains
Gas stations in the United States
Gas stations in Canada
Privately held companies based in Tennessee
CVC Capital Partners companies
Companies based in Knoxville, Tennessee
Convenience stores of the United States
American companies established in 1993
Retail companies established in 1993
Restaurants established in 1993
2017 mergers and acquisitions
Jimmy Haslam